As of 11 March 2023, the Singapore Armed Forces (SAF) has one three-star general—Chief of Defence Force, 3 two-star generals and 26 one-star generals or equivalent (to be updated).

Chiefs of Armed Services

Ministry of Defence/Joint Staff

Singapore Army

Republic of Singapore Navy

Republic of Singapore Air Force

Digital and Intelligence Service

References

Notes

General and flag officers of the Singapore Armed Forces
Singapore Armed Forces